138 (one hundred [and] thirty-eight) is the natural number following 137 and preceding 139.

In mathematics
138 is a sphenic number, the sum of four consecutive primes (29 + 31 + 37 + 41), and the smallest product of three primes, such that in base 10, the third prime is a concatenation of the other two: .

138 is the third 47-gonal number and an Ulam number, as well as a one step palindrome (138 + 831 = 969.)

138 is the 72nd normal congruent number and the 49th primitive or square free congruent number.

In astronomy
 138 Tolosa is a brightly colored, stony main belt asteroid
 The New General Catalogue object NGC-138, a spiral galaxy in the constellation Pisces
 The Saros number of the solar eclipse series which began on June 6, 1472 and will end on July 11, 2716.  The duration of Saros series 138 is 1244 years, and it contains 70 solar eclipses
 138P/Shoemaker-Levy is a periodic comet in the Solar System

In the military
 United States Air Force 138th Fighter Wing fighter unit stationed at Tulsa International Airport, Oklahoma
  was a United States Navy , transferred to the Soviet Navy in 1943
  was a United States Navy  during World War II
  was a United States Navy  during World War II
  was a United States Navy  during World War II
  was a United States Navy  during World War II
  was a United States Navy  during World War II

In transportation
 138th Street–Grand Concourse, the Bronx station on the IRT Jerome Avenue Line of the New York City Subway
 Third Avenue–138th Street, the Bronx station on the IRT Pelham Line of the New York City Subway

In media
"We Are 138", a 1978 song by the American punk rock band Misfits
1.3.8., a 2000 compilation album by the American death metal band Devourment

In other fields
138 is also:
 The year AD 138 or 138 BC
 The atomic number of untrioctium, a temporary chemical element
 Psalm 138
 Sonnet 138 by William Shakespeare
 In immunology, CD138 (syndecan-1) is used as a distinguishing marker for plasma cells.

See also
 List of highways numbered 138
 United Nations Security Council Resolution 138
 United States Supreme Court cases, Volume 138

References

 138 Constellations

Integers